Mkinga is one of the eleven districts of Tanga Region in Tanzania. It was created from Muheza District in 2007. The administrative capital of the district is located in a small town called Parungu Kasera. The district is bordered by  Tanga District to the south east and Muheza District to the south west. On the east the district is bordered by the Indian Ocean. On the west Korogwe Korogwe District and Lushoto District. On the north the district borders Kenya. The highest point in Korogwe District is Mhinduro Peak at 913m.

According to the 2012 Tanzania National Census, the population of Mkinga District was 118,065.

Administrative subdivisions

Wards
As of 2012, Mkinga District is administratively divided into 22 wards:

 Boma
 Bosha
 Bwiti
 Daluni
 Doda
 Duga

 Gombero
 Kigongoi Magharibi
 Kigongoi Mashariki
 Kwale
 Manza

 Mapatano
 Maramba
 Mayomboni
 Mhinduro
 Mkinga

 Mnyenzani
 Moa
 Mtimbwani
 Mwakijembe
 Parungu Kasera
 Sigaya

Transport
Paved trunk road T13 from Tanga to the Kenyan border passes through the district.

Education & Health 
As of 2022, there were 94 Schools in Mkinga District, 79 of are primary schools and 15 are secondary schools.

In Terms of Healthcare facilities, as of 2022 Mkinga District is home to 3 health centers and 27 clinics.

References

Districts of Tanga Region

sw:Mkinga